Eupithecia mundiscripta is a moth in the  family Geometridae. It is found in New Guinea, Taiwan, India (Meghalaya), the Philippines, Thailand, Vietnam, Malaysia, Sumatra, Borneo and Seram.

In the tropics, adults are on wing from June to March. In Hong Kong and Taiwan, adults have only been recorded in winter.

References

Moths described in 1907
mundiscripta
Moths of Asia